The Cummins Block Building, located at 161 E. Lincoln in Lincoln, Kansas, was listed on the National Register of Historic Places in 2000.

It was deemed notable "for its historical association with the growth and development of Lincoln, Kansas and ... for its architectural significance as an Italianate commercial block."

References

National Register of Historic Places in Lincoln County, Kansas
Italianate architecture in Kansas
Buildings and structures completed in 1881
Lincoln County, Kansas